Cops (stylized as COPS) is an American documentary/reality legal series that follows police officers, constables, sheriff's deputies, federal agents and state troopers during patrols and other police activities including prostitution and narcotics stings. It is one of the longest-running television programs in the United States and, as of May 2011, the longest-running show on Fox, following the cancellation of America's Most Wanted after 23 years. 

The show follows the activities of police officers by assigning television camera crews to accompany them as they perform their duties. The show's formula follows the cinéma vérité convention, with no narration or scripted dialog, depending entirely on the commentary of the officers and on the actions of the people with whom they come into contact. 

In 2013, Fox canceled Cops after 25 seasons, following requests by the Color of Change organization to do so. However, the series was soon picked up by Spike TV, a cable channel now known as Paramount Network. In 2020, the program was once again canceled, this time after its 32nd season. Despite its cancellation, production of a 33rd season began in September 2020, with the intentions of an international broadcast. In 2021, it was announced that Fox Nation picked up the show. The 33rd season premiered on October 1, 2021. The 34th season premiered on September 30, 2022.

Series overview

Episodes

Season 21 (2008–09) 
The current Langley Productions logo was introduced.
This is the first season to feature the 2008-2020 title card.

Season 22 (2009–10)

Season 23 (2010–11)

Season 24 (2011–12)

Season 25 (2012–2013) 
This is the last season on Fox before Spike picked up the show.

Season 26 (2013–14) 
The show moved to its final network Spike/Paramount Network starting with this season.

Season 27 (2014–15)

Season 28 (2015–16)

Season 29 (2016–17)

Season 30 (2017–18)

Season 31 (2018–19)

Season 32 (2019–20)

This is the last season to air on Paramount Network before its cancellation and subsequent revival.

Season 33 (2021–22)

Season 34 (2022)

References

External links 
 
 

Lists of American crime television series episodes